A cauldron is a large metal pot for cooking.

Cauldron may also refer to:

Music
 Cauldron (band), Canadian heavy metal band
 Cauldron (Fifty Foot Hose album), 1968
 Cauldron (Ruins album), 2008

Gaming
 Cauldron (Shackled City), the primary setting in The Shackled City Adventure Path
 Cauldron (video game), a 1985 computer game 
 Cauldron HQ, a computer game development studio located in Bratislava, Slovakia

Books
 Cauldron (Larry Bond novel), a 1993 novel by Larry Bond
 Cauldron (Jack McDevitt novel), a 2007 science fiction novel by Jack McDevitt

Military
 Cauldron (military term)
 The Cauldron, a WWII battlefield during the Battle of Gazala in North Africa
 Operation Cauldron, 1952 biological warfare experiment

Other uses
 Caldera, a cauldron-like volcanic feature
 The Cauldron, a UK-based esoteric magazine
 Olympic cauldron

See also
 
 Caldron (disambiguation)
 The Black Cauldron (disambiguation)
 Witches Cauldron (disambiguation)